Henry Raiwalui (born 24 February 1989) is a Fiji international rugby league footballer who plays as  or  for the London Broncos in the Betfred Championship.

He has previously played for the Wentworthville Magpies in the Ron Massey Cup.

Early life
Born in Sydney, Australia, Raiwalui is of Fijian descent. He grew up in Suva, Fiji from the age of two until year 4 of his schooling. He played his junior rugby league for the Earlwood Saints.

Playing career
In 2008 and 2009, Raiwalui played for the St. George Illawarra Dragons in the NYC, In 2012, he represented a Fijian XIII against an Italian XIII, scoring a try. before moving onto the Illawarra Cutters.

In 2016, Raiwalui made his Test debut for Fiji against Samoa.

In 2016 he also played for the Blacktown Workers in the Ron Massey Cup. He played for Wentworthville when they competed in the Ron Massey Cup.

In 2017, he joined the Mount Pritchard Mounties in the Intrust Super Premiership. Raiwalui was selected to play for Fiji in the 2017 Rugby League World Cup.

Raiwalui played for Wentworthville in their 2019 Ron Massey Cup grand final victory over St Mary's at Leichhardt Oval.

References

External links
Wentworthville Magpies profile
2017 RLWC profile
Fiji profile

1989 births
Living people
Australian rugby league players
Australian people of Fijian descent
Blacktown Workers players
Fiji national rugby league team players
Illawarra Cutters players
London Broncos players
Mount Pritchard Mounties players
Rugby league wingers
Rugby league fullbacks
Rugby league players from Sydney
Wentworthville Magpies players